Polyommatus attalaensis is a butterfly in the family Lycaenidae. It was described by Frédéric Carbonell et al. in 2004. It is found in Turkey. It was described as a subspecies of Polyommatus schuriani.

References

Butterflies described in 2004
Polyommatus
Butterflies of Asia
Butterflies of Europe